David Julian Hirsh (born October 26, 1973) is a Canadian actor.

Early life
Born and raised in a Jewish family in Montreal, Hirsh majored in criminology at the University of Toronto. He originally planned to become a lawyer until a summer acting workshop in New York convinced him to pursue an acting career. He studied acting at the Lee Strasberg Theatre and Film Institute in New York City.

Career
Hirsh starred in the first two seasons of the TNT medical drama series Hawthorne, and in shows such as the Showcase comedy series Naked Josh, Lovebites on TBS, the CBC Television drama miniseries St. Urbain's Horseman and he portrayed Rabbi David Bloom on Weeds. Hirsh starred in the 2013 television film Twist of Faith, which garnered him a Canadian Screen Award nomination.

Filmography

Film

Television

References

External links
 

1973 births
20th-century Canadian male actors
21st-century Canadian male actors
Anglophone Quebec people
Film producers from Quebec
Canadian male film actors
Canadian male screenwriters
Canadian male television actors
Living people
Male actors from Montreal
Writers from Montreal